Tuula Irmeli Peltonen (born 4 September 1962 in Juuka) is a Finnish politician and member of Finnish Parliament, representing the SDP. He has been member of parliament two times: 2007-2011 and  2011-2015.

External links
Parliament of Finland: Tuula Peltonen  
 Home page  
 Website 

1962 births
Living people
People from Juuka
Social Democratic Party of Finland politicians
Members of the Parliament of Finland (2007–11)
Members of the Parliament of Finland (2011–15) 
21st-century Finnish women politicians